Jeff Donaldson (1932 – 2004) was a visual artist whose work helped define the Black Arts Movement of the 1960s and 1970s. Donaldson, co-founder of AfriCOBRA and contributor to the momentous Wall of Respect, was a pioneer in African-American personal and academic achievement. His art work is known for creating alternative black iconography connected to Africa and rooted in struggle, in order to replace the history of demeaning stereotypes found in mainstream white culture.

In the midst of the racial and cultural turmoil of the 1960s, a group of African-American artists endeavored to relate its artwork to the black masses. Aiming to use art for social impact, artists such as Donaldson strived to create an "art for the people"—an art form that was recognizable by and directed toward the common black folk, rather than a group of well-educated elite. Within his works and collaborative efforts, Donaldson essentially became the father of a new, uniting aesthetic—transAfricanism.

Within AfriCOBRA, it was Donaldson’s idea to synthesize an all-encompassing transnational aesthetic—to, in effect, collaborate internationally to unify the then-fragmented concept of black art. The result of such unification would usher in a deeper understanding on the behalf of the African diasporic masses concerning its identity as a people. Having been displaced from their native lands and transplanted into foreign locations, members of the African diaspora grasped onto the only thing that remained of their lost identity—the fact that they descended from Africa, and that they were removed thence. Thus, ironically, the very factor which disowned the African diasporic peoples of their past identities became the fabric of their new self-concepts. The uniting efforts of Donaldson and AfriCOBRA not only furthered this sense of transnational identity among the diaspora, but gave it visibility, making it "official", in a way. As Donaldson described, "One rarely sees a black human-interest story [in the newspaper]” and of television, “not a single one of the new programs celebrates the beauty and dignity of black life style." Thus, he endeavored to put the true nature of blacks into the forefront—to give it an up-front face and therefore a recognized existence.

History 
Jeffrey Richardson Donaldson was born on December 15, 1932 in Pine Bluff, Arkansas to Clementine Frances Richardson Donaldson and Sidney Frank Donaldson Sr. He attended Merrill High School in Pine Bluff. He received a B.A. in Studio Art from the University of Arkansas at Pine Bluff in 1954, the college’s first studio art major.  He worked for a year at Lanier High School, establishing an arts program for black students then was drafted into the U.S. Army for service. Donaldson went on to complete his M.F.A. at the Institute of Design of the Illinois Institute of Technology of Chicago in 1963. In 1974, Donaldson earned the degree of Ph.D. from Northwestern University, becoming the first African American to do so in the nation.

As the chairman of Howard University beginning in 1970, Donaldson used his influence to revolutionize the curricula of the African and African-American art history majors. He broadened the narrowly defined concept of art to include its other, less mainstream facets, causing its most dedicated pupils to view it with a new respect and significance. Art came to be interpreted by these students as something that could take multiple and unique forms, as well as something that carried with it a social meaning. Thanks to his influence, the art program at Howard University become world-renowned.

AfriCobra and the TransAfrican aesthetic 
Donaldson’s arguably most significant impact on African diasporic art history was born with the formation of the groundbreaking group of which he was cofounder—AfriCOBRA. Originally called Coalition of Black Revolutionary Artists (COBRA), the group later renamed itself African Commune of Bad Relevant Artists (AfriCOBRA), a designation that held significance for several reasons. The name incorporated "Afri", which could refer both to the up-and-coming African-American hairstyle, the “afro”, as well as the collective heritage of all of the group members as African Americans. Thus, the inclusion of "Afri" intentionally distinguished the group from just any other collection of artists—indeed, even branded them with a unique and reputable purpose. The daughter group of OBAC endeavored to create a "celebratory art", as Donaldson phrased it. However, beyond creating an art that would champion the African American as the victor, this commune invented an art intended for the masses, and whether intentionally or not, pushed this community art beyond the edges of "sea to shining sea", in effect establishing one of the first ever international art forms.

Donaldson coined a term to describe the unifying phenomenon that he helped to produce, calling it "a 'transAfrican' style or movement". He described this incredible development as it was occurring worldwide, noting that "unrelated groups of artists [around the world]… have issued manifestoes…[defining] the transAfrican style/movement." AfriCOBRA, under Donaldson’s influence, was pivotal in the definition and support of the transAfrican movement by means of the various international and national conferences it both organized and participated in. Donaldson also coined the term "superreal". Superreal was used to describe the black/"transAfrican" aesthetic as practiced by AfriCOBRA: art that fills up, adds to, and exceeds reality.

In May 1970, the Chicago-based AfriCOBRA joined "'over 100 artists, art historians and educators, art consultants and critics…from across the country'" in order to consolidate their collective visions into one coherent directional plan for the future of African-American art. The conference, called CONFABA (Conference on the Functional Aspects of Black Art) was initiated by Donaldson and took place at Northwestern University in Evanston, Illinois. One result of this conference was the mutual influence and inspiration of one African diasporic artist on another, as artists fed off of each other’s creative styles and ideas. Donaldson mentioned the "spiritually uplift[ing]" influence of African-American artist Boghossian on the entire group of AfriCOBRA.

A few years later, Donaldson headed the North American committee of Second World Black and African Festival of Arts and Culture (FESTAC), the “largest pan-African cultural event ever held” as its chairman. The international festival took place in 1977 in Lagos, Nigeria. Other international and national conferences ensued, resulting in what Donaldson referred to as "an informal international coterie of creative people of African descent." The significance of this new artistic cadre, knit together through the fibers of similar interests, talents and most importantly, visions of influence and change was that it provided African-American artists with a collective mission: to celebrate those of African descent as intelligent, talented, beautiful, hardworking, and as conquerors.

TransAfrican style in art 
According to Donaldson, the transAfrican style is characterized by "high energy colour, rhythmic linear effects, flat patterning, form-filled composition and picture plane compartmentalization." These characteristics are conveyed in his collective work, as with the groups OBAC and AfriCOBRA. Distinguished AfriCOBRA member, Barbara Jones-Hogu, wrote how the works called for "bright vivid singing Cool-ade colors of orange, strawberry, cherry, lemon, lime and grape...using syncopated, rhythmic repetition that constantly changes in color, texture, shapes, form, pattern, and feature." Taking the famous Wall of Respect for example, it possesses a character of vibrancy, achieved with the use of bright, flashy colors and bold patterns. Cool green and dark blue contrast with the warm oranges, crimsons and yellows to create an eye-catching, visually stimulating work. The contrasts made within the bold color palette, especially on the bottom half of the work, come together in such a way that reflects Donaldson’s concept of "picture plane compartmentalization", while the rhythmic aspect of the style is reflected in the jazz instruments. This motion is also shown in the fluid strokes of yellow behind the political heads in the upper left corner. True to its cause, the mural depicts African Americans as champions, displaying the heads and figures of the diaspora’s most successful and highly regarded members.

The transAfrican style was manifest in Donaldson’s individual work as well, as is demonstrated in the 1971 piece entitled Victory in the Valley of Eshu. The work depicts an elderly black couple holding what appears to be an eye-shaped pinwheel. The pinwheel is actually an "African American symbol of freedom, the six-legged star". In addition to displaying national diasporic symbols, Victory in the Valley of Eshu incorporates many elements of traditional African culture, paying homage to the common heritage of diaspora members. The work is filled with Yoruba and traditional African references, including the Yoruba Sango dance wand in the right hand of the man, references to deified ancestors (a Yoruba belief), the name "Esu", who is the Yoruba god of fate, and others. The newly prominent element of “shine”, an aesthetic effect mimicking or displaying physical shine in order to reflect the bright, star-like quality of ordinary African Americans, is visible in this piece. This effect achieves the "celebration" aspect of black art: an art that, as stated by Donaldson, "define[s], glorif[ies], and direct[s] black people—an art for the people’s sake." The notion of "shine" that is conveyed through the collection of small dots of color in the figures’ hair and surrounding their bodies. Additionally, the afros of the couple seem to mimic halos. These elements, in combination with the couple’s bright white clothing, complete the celebration of the ordinary in this African diasporic work. The little splotches and dots of color seem to emanate from the bodies and to dance their way around the edges of the portrait, conveying that notion of a rhythmic motion which was integral in transAfrican work.

Donaldson explicitly stated the need for an "emotional intensity" in TransAfrican work, which would be achieved through a musical/rhythmic feel or representation. This notion is only hinted at in Victory in the Valley of Eshu. However, it is clearly evident in Donaldson’s later work, JamPact JelliTite (for Jamila). This piece, created in 1988, carries with it the notion of "shine", only now in the form of dancing squares, diamonds and zig-zags of color. The popular abstract style of the late 20th century is apparent in his work, and there is a clear shift from the humanistic and realistic forms to geometric shapes and lines. The geometric shapes, however, along with the bustling activity, bright colors, and concentric circles, combine to endow the work with a traditional, almost tribal African feel. The energetic movement of the piece is compounded by the musical and rhythmic themes that dominate the work. Partially hidden elements of jazz music, displayed in the bass player, the singer, and the pianist can be traced within the painting.

Notably, there has been a shift within Donaldson’s works in both style and means of communicating transAfrican themes, especially those of rhythm. This shift has been away from traditional references to traditional African art (Yoruba images), concrete images of blacks in power, and the glorification of the black body and black lifestyle. Instead, transAfrican images have more recently been conveyed in geometric shapes and rhythmic motion that reflect traditional African rhythms and motions. This shift in transAfrican style within Donaldson’s work was paralleled by a shift in the collective work of members of the African diaspora. The change has generally been one in which one unified group aesthetic is no longer prevalent. In other words, while transAfrican art still maintains its general themes in an overarching community, fewer stylistically singular group efforts are being pursued, as was the case with the Wall of Respect. Donaldson noted this change, and reflected that the broadening geographic diversity within the African diasporic art movement has "greatly increased contacts with other Africentric artists in the various cities, thereby intensifying individual expression within the context of unity." As time progressed from the idealistic era of CONFABA, transAfrican art became more and more difficult to define. Perhaps the notion of "transAfrican" art—or an art that would encompass all of African history, as well as the history of the African diaspora—was too ambitious a goal, one that is nearly impossible to fulfill while maintaining the integrity of each facet of African art. The lofty goal of this all-encompassing, unified art form seems to be fading. It was noted recently that "geographical dispersal [of artists of the African diaspora] has reduced gatherings of the entire membership [of the international conferences of diasporic artists] to twice a year." Perhaps the diaspora is simply too large and diverse for such a unification to persist, or perhaps the transAfrican art form has already been established, and its former creators, having established their community, are now seeking forms of individual expression.

Even if the transAfrican aesthetic is fading, its impact on the international African diaspora was monumental, and the creation of this aesthetic gave members of the diaspora everywhere a visibility that they had previously lacked in their unspoken and invisible unity. This in turn provided them with greater authority as a recognized unity of people. By means of his transAfrican style and community-oriented artwork, Jeff Donaldson showed members of the African diaspora that they were indeed an independent, able people who were not to be perpetually confined to the role of the conquered. Donaldson’s work instigated the first with a communal effort to represent a global African art culture/aesthetic, and the legacy and impact of his efforts are indelible.

Notes

References
Donaldson, Jeff R. "AfriCobra and TransAtlantic Connections". Seven Stories about Modern Art in Africa, 1995. 
Gaither, E. B. "Jeff Donaldson: The mind behind the cultural revolution (Organization of Black American Culture)". International Review of African American Art, 2001. 
Harris, Michael D. "Dedication to Jeff Donaldson, 15 December 1932 to 29 February 2004". The International Review of African American Art, vol. 19 no. 3, 2004: 2. 
Okediji, Moyosore Benjamin. "Semioptics of Anamnesia: Yoruba Images in the Works of Jeff Donaldson, Howardena Pindell, and  Muneer Bahauddeen". Diss. University of Wisconsin-Madison, 1995. Ann Arbor: UMI, 1995. AAT 9527112. 
Van Deburg, William L. (ed.), Modern Black Nationalism: From Marcus Garvey to Louis Farrakhan. New York and London: New York University Press, 1997.
Adenekan, Shola. "Jeff Donaldson: Militant Artist and Critic who Supported Malcolm X." The New Black Magazine. Web. Picture
Adenekan, Shola. "Jeff Donaldson Militant artist and critic who was active in the black arts movement", The Guardian. 13 March 2004. Web.
Donaldson, Jeff. "Donaldson: Wives of Shango." American Studies @ The University of Virginia. Web. 18 November 2009.
Donaldson, Jeff R. "AfriCobra and TransAtlantic Connections." Seven Stories About Modern Art in Africa. Whitechapel Gallery, 1995. Print.
"Jae Jarrell's Revolutionary Suit." Black World/Negro Digest, October 1970: 85-85. Print.
"Jeff Donaldson Biography", The HistoryMakers. 23 April 2001. Web.
Okediji, Moyo. The Shattered Gourd: Yoruba Forms in Twentieth-Century American Art. Seattle: University of Washington, 2003. Google Books. Web.
O'Sullivan, Michael. "'Transatlantic Dialogue': Cultural Cross Talk", The Washington Post. 26 March 2000. Web.
Painter, Nell I. Creating Black Americans: African-American and its Meanings, 1619 to Present. New York: Oxford UP, 2006. Google Books. Web.
Patton, Sharon F. African American Art. New York, NY: Oxford UP, 1998. Print. Section, "Twentieth-Century America: The Evolution of a Black Aesthetic".
Warren, Lynne (ed.), Art in Chicago, 1945-1995. New York, NY: Thames and Hudson, 1996. Print.

External links 
 Jeff Donaldson papers from Archives of American Art, Smithsonian Institution 
 Jeff Donaldson interview (from 2001), video and biography from The HistoryMakers

1932 births
2004 deaths
Yoruba art
University of Arkansas alumni
Northwestern University alumni
20th-century American artists
Illinois Institute of Technology alumni
Folk artists
African-American painters
20th-century African-American artists
21st-century African-American people